Stanley Edward Eldon (born 1 May 1936 in Windsor, Berkshire) is a retired British cross country runner. Eldon is notable for winning the International Cross Country Championships held in Cardiff in 1958.
He was awarded his MBE for his work in setting up the Reading half- marathon.

Eldon was inspired to become a runner after viewing a film of the 1948 Olympics and joined Eton Athletics Club. In 1956 he ran a junior World Best of 14 minutes 19 seconds over 3 miles. As an adult he came to note as an aggressive front runner. In 1958 he won the International Cross Country Championships in a time of 46 minutes 29 seconds beating Alain Mimoun and Frank Sando into second and third respectively. That same year Eldon won the inaugural Nos Galan road race, and was the mystery runner in the race in 1964.

References

1936 births
Living people
Sportspeople from Windsor, Berkshire
English male long-distance runners
International Cross Country Championships winners
Athletes (track and field) at the 1958 British Empire and Commonwealth Games
Commonwealth Games competitors for England